La dama de rosa (English title: The lady of the rose) is a Venezuelan telenovela written by José Ignacio Cabrujas and produced by Radio Caracas Televisión in 1986. This telenovela lasted 144 episodes and it achieved a significant amount of success inside and outside Venezuela.  It was distributed internationally by RCTV International.

 and Carlos Mata starred as the main protagonists. La dama de rosa was remade by RCTV in 1997 under the name Cambio de Piel.

Synopsis
Gabriela Suárez, a theater student and cheerleader for a basketball team begins a job at a carwash in order to help out her family - her father has just died and she is the eldest of her siblings. The carwash is owned by a famous businessman, Tito Clemente, who will meet Gabriela and have a short but passionate affair with her. Gabriela, however, is falsely accused of drug trafficking and ends up in jail, with a 15-year sentence. Tito abandons her due to her bad luck, choosing to ignore the fact that she is expecting his child. In jail, Gabriela plots her escape, something she pulls off after having served seven years behind bars. Only one objective drives her existence: revenge against the man who ruined her life, Tito Clemente. To achieve her purpose, she changes her name and her physical appearance and manages to reintroduce herself into the life of Tito, making him fall in love with her all over again.

Cast
 as Gabriela Suárez (alias Emperatriz Ferrer)
Carlos Mata as Tito Clemente
Miguel Alcantara as David Rangel
Jaime Araque as Nelson Suárez
Guy Ecker as Simon Suárez
Gisvel Ascanio as Elsa
Haydee Balza as Carmen
Xavier Bracho as José Antonio Clemente (child)
Gladys Caceres as Mercedes Olvido Rangel
Fernando Carrillo as Jose Luis
Dalila Colombo as Leyla Kebil
Helianta Cruz as Margot
Guillermo Ferran as Martin Clemente
Juan Frankis as Eloy González
Humberto Garcia as Asdrúbal
Zulay Lopez as Grecia
Felix Loreto as Aníbal Ortega
Alberto Marin as Comisario
Jonathan Montenegro as Diego Suárez
Amalia Perez Diaz as Lucia Suárez
Victoria Roberts as Julia Suárez
Irina Rodríguez as María Fernanda
Francis Romero as Sonia
Marcelo Romo as Joaquín Mendoza
Eniz Santos as Nelly
Carlota Sosa as Amparo
Carlos Villamizar as Benavides
Gigi Zanchetta as Eleonora

References

External links
La dama de rosa at the Internet Movie Database

1986 telenovelas
RCTV telenovelas
Spanish-language telenovelas
Venezuelan telenovelas
1986 Venezuelan television series debuts
1986 Venezuelan television series endings
Television shows set in Venezuela